The Straits Settlements cricket team was the team that represented the Straits Settlements in international cricket matches between 1890 and 1940.

History

Between 1890 and 1909, the Straits Settlements played regular Interport matches against Hong Kong, Ceylon and Shanghai. After 1909 they formed the combined Malaya cricket team along with the Federated Malay States for these matches, but continued to play international matches against the Federated Malay States.

Players

The following players played for the Straits Settlements and also played first-class cricket:

Charles Higginbotham - played for the South African Army in 1906 and the British Army in 1912
Henry Talbot - played for the MCC in 1895
Theodore Hubback - played for Lancashire in 1892
John Healing - played for Cambridge University and Gloucestershire between 1894 and 1906
Edward Barrett - played for Hampshire between 1896 and 1925
Walter Parsons - played for Hampshire in 1882
Francis Mugliston - played for Lancashire between 1906 and 1908
Bruce Eddis - played for a combined Army/Navy team in 1919
William Goodman - played for the Gentlemen of Philadelphia in 1899
Sydney Maartensz - played for Hampshire in 1919
John Chamberlain - played for Western Australia in 1907
Robert Braddell - played for Oxford University and the MCC between 1908 and 1911
Cyril Simpson - played for Northamptonshire in 1908
Richard Wodehouse - played for the Europeans in India in 1923 and 1924
Trevor Spring - played for Somerset in 1909 and 1910
Edward Baker - played for Sussex between 1912 and 1919 and for Somerset in 1921
Gerald Livock - played for Middlesex between 1925 and 1927
Robert Phayre - played first-class cricket in India in 1925
Edward Armitage - played for Hampshire between 1919 and 1925
Billy King - played for Dublin University in 1922
Charles Congdon - played for the Royal Navy between 1921 and 1929
John Neve - played for the MCC in 1936
Philip Stewart-Brown - played for Oxford University between 1924 and 1926
Gerald Aste - played for various teams in India between 1922 and 1936
Herbert Hopkins - played for Worcestershire between 1921 and 1931
Godfrey Bryan - played for Kent between 1920 and 1933
Cecil Wigglesworth - played for the Royal Air Force in 1927
Denys Hill - played for Worcestershire between 1927 and 1929
Bertie Perkins - played for Glamorgan between 1925 and 1933
Victor Croome - played for the Royal Air Force between 1928 and 1930
Cyril Reed - played ten first class matches in India between 1928 and 1948
Frank Simpson - played for the Army in 1931
Ernest Dynes - played for the Minor Counties between 1928 and 1930
Laddie Outschoorn - played for Worcestershire between 1946 and 1959
Reginald Thoy - played two first-class matches in England in 1955 and 1957
Francis Hugonin - played for Essex in 1927 and 1928

References

Cricket in the Straits Settlements
National cricket teams